Primula farinosa, the bird's-eye primrose, is a small perennial plant in the family Primulaceae, native to Northern Europe and northern Asia, and (rarely) farther south at high altitudes in the mountains of southern Europe. This primrose thrives on grazed meadows rich in lime and moisture.

Growth
The violet-blue flowers appear in early spring, and often in rounded clusters on top of a powdery stem when the plant is older.

References

External links
Majviva from guteinfo.com

farinosa
Alpine flora
Medicinal plants
Plants described in 1753
Taxa named by Carl Linnaeus
Taxobox binomials not recognized by IUCN 

ko:설앵초
ja:ユキワリソウ